Disney Parks, Experiences and Products, Inc., formerly Walt Disney Parks and Resorts Worldwide, Inc. and informally known as Disney Parks, is one of The Walt Disney Company's five major business segments and a subsidiary. It was founded on April 1, 1971, exactly six months before the opening of Magic Kingdom at Walt Disney World Resort in Bay Lake, Florida, just outside of Orlando.

Originally, the company was known as Walt Disney Outdoor Recreation Division and later as Walt Disney Attractions. The most recent chairman of Walt Disney Parks and Resorts was Bob Chapek, formerly president of Disney Consumer Products. Chapek was promoted to CEO of The Walt Disney Company on February 25, 2020. On May 18, 2020, Josh D'Amaro was appointed as chairman of the division, succeeding Chapek. In 2018, the company's theme parks hosted over 157.3 million guests, making Disney Parks the world's most visited theme park company worldwide, with United Kingdom-based Merlin Entertainments coming in second at 67 million guests. It is by far Disney's largest business segment according to employee headcount, with approximately 130,000 of the company's 180,000 employees as of 2015. In March 2018, Disney Consumer Products and Interactive Media was merged into Parks and Resorts and renamed Disney Parks, Experiences and Products. In September 2020, Disney Parks, Experiences and Products laid off 28,000 employees in wake of the COVID-19 pandemic.

Background 

Originally, entry into the theme park and travel business was a side project of Walt Disney himself. As the Disneylandia project started to become a reality, Walt Disney Productions at Walt's request set up Disneyland, Inc. (DLI) in 1951 and agreed to a design deal in March 1953 with WED Enterprises (WED), Walt's personal corporation, which then included what would now be called Walt Disney Imagineering. With the WED concept designs and prospectus for Disneylandia, Roy Disney in September 1953 met with TV networks in a deal for Disney-produced TV show and Disneyland investment. American Broadcasting-Paramount Theatres (AB-PT) agreed to the Disneyland, Inc. investment. Joining AB-PT as Disneyland investors were Walt Disney Productions (WDP), Western Publishing and Walt Disney. Walt Disney Productions had the option to repurchase the Walt Disney, WED and Western Publishing shares (31%) by May 1, 1959, for $562,500.

With a need for the Disneyland Hotel nearby and no funding available for Disney to build it, Walt Disney approached Jack Wrather to build the hotel who agreed.

On , the Disneyland park opened with five themed "lands" containing eighteen attractions with double the expected guests. WED owned Santa Fe & Disneyland Railroad opened, too.

On June 29, 1957, Disney Production exercised its options to purchase all but AB-PT's common stock outstanding. This allowed WDP to consolidate DLI into its 1957 annual accounting statements adding four months' worth of net profits, $511K. In June 1960, Walt Disney Productions completed the purchase of AB-PT's share of the company for nearly $7.5 million and its TV contract, and the theme park became a fully owned subsidiary of Walt Disney Productions.

History 
Beginning in 1958 with the contracting of Economics Research Associates (ERA) to find a location for another Disney resort, Disney Productions moved beyond a single park. ERA recommended Florida; another study in 1961 named Ocala or Orlando in Florida as possible locations. In , Walt Disney made a trip to Florida for final site selection.:333, 334 In 1962, Disney Productions purchased Celebrity Sports Center (opened on September 17, 1960, in Denver, Colorado) from its owners, including Walt Disney, Art Linkletter, and John Payne, to use as a staff training center for its second resort. Plans for the Florida project that would eventually become Walt Disney World were announced to the public in November 1965. Legislation forming the Reedy Creek Improvement District, the Reedy Creek Improvement Act, was signed into law by Florida Governor Claude R. Kirk, Jr. on May 12, 1967, allowing Disney to build the infrastructure for the second park. Ground breaking followed for the future Reedy Creek park on May 30. In Roy O. Disney's last act as CEO in 1968, he officially named the second park Walt Disney World.:357

Disneyland International was incorporated on November 20, 1961. The next year, The Oriental Land Company contacted Disney about building a theme park.

In 1959, the WED-owned Disneyland-Alweg Monorail System was installed at Disneyland.

The first Audio-Animatronic attraction, Walt Disney's Enchanted Tiki Room, opened at Disneyland in 1963. Tomorrowland was revamped in 1967 with seven new attractions. The design and architectural group and the WED Enterprise name was purchased from Walt's corporation, renamed as Retlaw Enterprise.

Disney expanded into attractions at the 1964 New York World's Fair with It's a Small World and costumed character appearances. When the characters proved a hit at the 1964 World's Fair, Walt wanted another outlet for "live" characters; thus, Disneyland put on Disney on Parade, a self-produced live arena show starting in 1969. Small World and its famous song lasted two years at the fair; it was then moved to Disneyland as an expanded major attraction in 1966 and later duplicated in the other Disney theme parks.

In 1965, Walt Disney won a bid with the US Forest Service to develop Mineral King as a ski resort. The Forest Service appealed and won at the appeal and the Supreme Court. The Supreme Court ruling left open to the club the possibility of refiling. In the next round of lawsuits, the same district judge blocked the redevelopment. The injunction and the passage of the National Environmental Policy Act led to Disney backing out.

The next year in February, an agreement was made with multiple labor unions, in which the unions exchanged the right to strike for regular pay increases during the first building phase. By 1971, chairman of the Park Operations Committee and vice president of park operations Dick Nunis was appointed executive vice president of Disneyland and Walt Disney World.

The Magic Kingdom had six themed lands: Main Street, Adventureland, Fantasyland, Frontierland, Liberty Square, and Tomorrowland. Additionally, Disney's Fort Wilderness Resort campground and two hotels, Disney's Contemporary Resort and Disney's Polynesian Village Resort, also opened.

Disneyland expanded in 1972 with a seventh themed land, Bear Country, replacing the Indian Village of Frontierland, and later renamed Critter Country. In 1979, the Disneyland crafts and maintenance union workers went on strike for 15 days, at first, rejecting and then accepting the park's contract. Space Mountain opens at Disneyland in 1977.

At Walt Disney World, the Treasure Island nature preserve pens opened on April 8, 1974,:569 renamed Discovery Island in 1977.:126 On , the WEDway PeopleMover opened in the Magic Kingdom's Tomorrowland.

In 1979, Oriental Land and Disney agreed to build a Japanese theme park.

Walt Disney Outdoor Recreation Division 
With the retirement of Donn Tatum as Walt Disney Productions' Chairman and CEO on June 3, 1980, three divisions were formed, including the Walt Disney Outdoor Recreation Division, of which Disney Legend, Dick Nunis was named division president. Disneyland started using Disney Dollars on May 5, 1987, while Walt Disney World parks started with Epcot on October 2. A renegotiated Disneyland Japan royalty agreement in April 1988 by Chief Financial Officer Gary L. Wilson netted Disney US$723 million in cash in exchange for lower royalty payments.

The steam railroad and monorail at Disneyland were purchased from Retlaw Enterprises, formerly WED Enterprises, in 1982. Bear Country was renamed Critter Country on November 23, 1988.

Tishman Company's plans for two Walt Disney World hotels were rejected by the new CEO Michael Eisner on September 30, 1984, marking a change in Disney architecture. New plans for the Dolphin and Swan hotels were submitted by Michael Graves in July 1986; ground breaking took place on January 28, 1988. The first non-Disney owned hotel, Pickett Suite Resort, opened in Disney World Village on March 15, 1987.

On June 1, 1982, the Walt Disney World monorail line was extended to EPCOT Center from the Ticket and Transportation Center.:338 The EPCOT Center theme park opened on October 1, 1982, at a building cost of US$1.2 billion, with two areas, Future World and World Showcase.:272

Plans for a Hollywood-style theme park were announced in April 1985 for the Walt Disney World resort at a project cost of US$300 million. In April 1985, Disney signed a licensing agreement with MGM, giving Disney the right to use the MGM name, logo and movie library for this third park. Construction of the Disney-MGM Studios theme park began in 1986. Disney-MGM Studios opened on May 1, 1989, along with a Pleasure Island entertainment area; its second water park, Disney's Typhoon Lagoon, opened on June 1. In 1983, Walt Disney World Village's name was changed to the Disney Village Marketplace. A new themed area, Mickey's Birthdayland, opened in the Magic Kingdom near Fantasyland on June 18, 1988.

In 1987, Disney and Ron Brierley's Industrial Equity (Pacific) Ltd., already a 28% owner of the Wrather Corporation, agreed to purchase the remaining Wrather Corporation stock with a 50% share each. Wrather Corporation owned the Disneyland Hotel and operated the Queen Mary and Spruce Goose tourist attractions. In March 1988, Disney purchased Industrial Equity's half of Wrather Corporation.

In 1985, Premier Cruise Line became the licensed partner cruise line with Disney. This allowed Disney characters on their ships and combined cruise, hotel, and theme park packages.

Walt Disney Attractions 
The Walt Disney Outdoor Recreation Division was incorporated as Walt Disney Attractions, Inc. on August 10, 1989. In January 1990, Disney CEO Eisner announced plans to expand both Disneyland (by 20% in 10 years) and Walt Disney World (WDW). The plan would have WDW add another theme park and 16 new attractions in Disney-MGM Studios. Disney and The Coca-Cola Company agreed to a 15-year marketing contract on January 25: Coca-Cola products would be exclusive in Disney theme parks, and Coca-Cola would use some Disney characters in their ads. On March 16, 1990, Attractions president Nunis announced a 25-year plan for a  development in Osceola, Florida, with homes, shopping malls and industrial buildings.

In 1990, the possibility of a West Coast version of Epcot Center was placed in development. This was announced as WestCOT in 1991, to be placed at the Disneyland Resort. On July 31, 1990, a new  ocean-themed park and resort, Port Disney, was announced for Long Beach. Port was to have a cruise-ship terminal, five hotels, restaurants, and shopping areas, costing $2 billion to build. On December 12, 1991, Disney selected only one California project to go forward with, Disneyland Resort, which was to include the WestCOT Center, hotels, a shopping mall, and a lake.  Port Disney was abandoned in March 1992, and Disney canceled its leases on the Queen Mary and Spruce Goose attractions picked up from the Wrather Corporation. Mickey's Toontown, a new themed land at Disneyland, opened on January 24, 1993. Disney canceled its plans for WestCOT in mid-1995 due to financial issues at Disneyland Paris and the park's projected high cost. That park was then replaced by plans for the California Adventure park, hotels, and a retail district.

At Walt Disney World, Mickey's Birthdayland closed on April 22, 1991, then reopened on May 26 as Mickey's Starland.324, 329, 333 In order to expand Disney World on wetland, on April 23, 1993, the company agreed to form an  wilderness preserve in Florida, known as the Disney Wilderness Preserve. The Disney Inn hotel was leased starting February 1, 1994, by the US Army, then purchased on January 12, 1996, and later renamed Shades of Green.130 Planet Hollywood opened a location in Pleasure Island on December 17, 1994. The third water park at Walt Disney World, Disney's Blizzard Beach, opened on April 1, 1995. The Magic Kingdom's Tomorrowland was completely refurbished and reopened in June 1995. Taking up a corner of the Magic Kingdom parking lot, the Walt Disney World Speedway opened on November 28, 1995. In 1996, the Disney Institute opened on February 9, and Disney's BoardWalk opened on July 1. The first of the World of Disney stores opened in the Disney Village Marketplace on October 3. The Downtown Disney district opened in November 1997, combining Disney Village Marketplace and Pleasure Island. A fourth theme park, Disney's Animal Kingdom, opened at Disney World the week of April 20, 1998.

The first Disney Vacation Club Resorts, Vacation Club Resort, opened on October 1, 1991, and was renamed Disney's Old Key West Resort in January 1996. These vacation club hotels were operated by Disney Vacation Developments, Inc. as vacation timeshares. The first off-resort vacation club hotel was Vacation Club Resort, which opened on October 1, 1995, in Vero Beach, Florida.

In 1993, Premier Cruises discontinued its partnership with Disney for one with Warner Bros. After failing to reach agreements with Carnival or Royal Caribbean, Disney announced in 1994 the formation of its cruise line. The Disney Cruise Line launched with the Disney Magic ship in 1998 along with its exclusive resort island port of Castaway Cay.

Disney reportedly had plans to build a park named Disney's America. The park was to have been located in Haymarket, Virginia;  of property were purchased from Exxon in 1993. The history-themed park was announced on November 11, 1993. The plans for the  called for a  amusement park, a campground, a golf course,  of office/commercial space, and 2500 homes. With projections indicating that the park would operate at a loss and with opposition in the press, Disney canceled the project on September 15, 1994.

Walt Disney Imagineering created Disney Fair, a U.S. traveling attraction, which premiered in September 1996. The fair was poorly attended and was pulled after a few stops. Disney Entertainment Projects (Asia Pacific) Inc., a new Disney Asian Pacific subsidiary, selected a renamed fair called DisneyFest as its first project, taking it to Singapore to open there on October 30, 1997.

In November 1995, Disney announced the building of Tokyo DisneySea, to be owned by Oriental along with Tokyo Disneyland. Oriental and Disney signed the DisneySea licensing agreement in November 1997; the theme park was scheduled to open in 2001 at a cost of $2.6 billion.

In December 1998, Walt Disney Attractions added Disneyland Paris, Disney Regional Entertainment and Walt Disney Imagineering to its portfolio, which already held Disney World, Disney Cruise Line, Disneyland, and Tokyo Disneyland. Chairman Dick Nunis retired at the same time. On October 31, 1999, Walt Disney Attractions, Inc. was merged into Walt Disney Attractions, LLC.

On June 19, 1998, Disney Regional Entertainment opened its first DisneyQuest, a location-based entertainment venue, at Downtown Disney West Side in Walt Disney World. The first DisneyQuest outside of a resort was opened in Chicago on June 16, 1999, with plans for more locations worldwide.

In 1999, plans were announced for a new resort in Hong Kong, Hong Kong Disneyland, as a joint venture, Hong Kong International Theme Parks Ltd., between the Hong Kong Government and Disney Resorts. The Disney Wonder cruise ship began operation on August 15. Disney World's Discovery Island was closed on April 8, 1999.

Disney Destinations 
Walt Disney Attractions, LLC changed its name to Walt Disney Parks and Resorts, LLC on April 14, 2000, then to Disney Destinations, LLC on April 25, 2006. Tokyo DisneySea at Tokyo Disney Resort opened on September 4, 2001. The Walt Disney Company in selling its Japanese and US chains decided to keep the Disney Stores in Europe, along with the store in Manhattan, which was converted into a World of Disney store run by Walt Disney Parks and Resorts in 2004.

Downtown Disney opened at the Disneyland Resort on January 12, 2001, between Disneyland and the future California Adventure.  Disney California Adventure Park opened at the Disneyland Resort on February 8, 2001, with three major areas: Paradise Pier, Hollywood Pictures Backlot, and the Golden State. In California Adventure on October 6, 2002, A Bug's Land area opened. Parks and Resorts chairman Jay Rasulo announced at Disney's D23 Expo in Anaheim, California on September 12, 2009, that Walt Disney World's Fantasyland would be overhauled and increased in size by 2013. A $1 billion expansion/renovation of Disney California Adventure Park was announced in 2007 to be completed by 2012.

River Country water park closed on November 2, 2001. Disney-MGM Studios is renamed Disney's Hollywood Studios in January 2008. Pleasure Island's core remaining six nightclubs were closed down in late 2008 to change the area to match the family friendly make-up of the other two sections of Downtown Disney at Disney World.

Walt Disney Studios Park opened March 16, 2002, as the second theme park at the renamed Disneyland Resort Paris. The first park was renamed Disneyland Park (DLP). DLP Paris opened in August 2000 Toy Story Playland with three attractions.

Construction on Hong Kong Disneyland began on January 12, 2003, then opened September 12, 2005. Groundbreaking occurred at Hong Kong Disneyland in December 2009 for a three land expansion: Mystic Point, Grizzly Gulch, and Toy Story Land.

In June 2005, Disney Magic made the first cruise outside of the Caribbean, by moving its port for the summer to Los Angeles with a Mexican Riviera schedule. Disney Cruise Line ordered a new 2 ships class from Meyer Werft shipyard in Germany by February 22, 2007. The Magic in May 2007 transferred its homeport to Barcelona, Spain, for the lines' first summer Mediterranean itinerary then returned to its permanent port in September.

The Chicago DisneyQuest location was closed in September 2001. Disney Parks started the Adventures by Disney tour vacation business in 2005. Disney entered a float, "The Most Magical Celebration on Earth", into the 2006 Pasadena Tournament of Roses parade.

In October 2007, Disney announced plans to build a resort at Ko Olina Resort & Marina in Kapolei, Hawaii, featuring both a hotel and Disney Vacation Club timeshare units. The 800-unit property, named Aulani, opened in 2011 and joined the other resorts not associated with a theme park, such as Disney's Hilton Head Island Resort in South Carolina.

With the Walt Disney World Millennium Celebration starting on October 1, 2000, sanctioned Disney pin trading was started. In 2001, the Themed Entertainment Association gave Disney Parks and Resorts the Thea Award for Breakthrough Innovation for the park's FastPass system.

Walt Disney Parks and Resorts Worldwide 
Walt Disney Parks and Resorts Worldwide, Inc. was incorporated on September 29, 2008, and took over the parks and resorts business segment. Disney Parks and Resorts reorganized in early 2009 which included layoffs in all units due to recession-induced falling attendance. 600 U.S. managers in January were buyout packages. Worldwide Operations was formed under President Al Weiss in 2009. Worldwide Operations would take over various back-office functions previously performed by both Disney World and Disneyland including training, procurement, menu planning, and merchandise development. While its Walt Disney Imagineering subsidiary combined its three development units.

In November 2009, Disney received approval from the Chinese government to build a Disneyland resort in Shanghai's Pudong district. The resort opened on June 16, 2016.

California Adventure completed its overhaul in 2012 adding two new lands: Cars Land and Buena Vista Street. The overhaul also included a re-themed of several attractions plus a pair of classic dark rides. In July 2017, it was announced that Paradise Pier land would be replaced by Pixar Pier, with four neighborhoods, and the remainder not in Pixar Pier would be replaced by Paradise Park. Pixar Pier opened on June 23, 2018.

Star Wars: Galaxy's Edge, a  themed land for both Disneyland and Disney's Hollywood Studios announced at the D23 Expo on August 15, 2015. Construction began at both locations on April 14, 2016. The lands at both parks opened in 2019.

The New Fantasyland at Magic Kingdom opened on December 6, 2012. It is the biggest upgrade to the theme park since its opening in 1971. Announced along with its new Star Wars Land expansion at the D23 Expo on August 15, 2015, Hollywood Studios was slated to have a version of Toy Story Land.

Holz became president of New Vacation Operations of Parks & Resorts reporting to Al Weiss, president of worldwide operations for Walt Disney Parks and Resorts. by April 2008. In February 2009, Holz returned to the presidency of Disney Cruise Line in addition to his continuing as head of New Vacation Operations, which was primarily Adventures by Disney. As an extension of the "One Disney" initiative and the resignation of Weiss, Disney Vacation Club was added to New Vacation Operations. While Holz and Meg Crofton joined Disney Parks and Resorts executive committee in July 2011. At that time, Crofton was transferred from Disney World president to president of operations in the U.S. and France, a new positions.

The Disney Dream ship began service in January 2011 and Disney Cruise Line (DCL) announced the maiden voyage of the Disney Fantasy to be March 31, 2012. The Dream deployment allowed Disney Wonder to be stationed at Port of Los Angeles for Mexican Riviera cruises, but initial served in the short Alaska cruise season. Magic moved to New York for Canadian or Bahama cruises starting May 25, 2012. DCL's Magic was refitted in late 2013.

The first of three expansion theme lands at Hong Kong Disneyland, Toy Story Land, opened on November 18, 2011. Grizzly Gulch opened at Hong Kong Disneyland on July 13, 2012. The final land of this expansion, Mystic Point, opened at Hong Kong Disneyland on May 17, 2013.

On February 5, 2015, it was announced that Tom Staggs had been promoted to Disney Company Chief operating officer but would continue as chairman of Parks and Resorts until his successor was named. On February 23, 2015, Robert Chapek was named chairman of Walt Disney Parks and Resorts effective that day.

On April 29, 2015, The Walt Disney Company, through the subsidiary, Carousel Holdings Eat LLC, has purchased Carousel Inn & Suites hotel in Anaheim, from Good Hope International for $32 million. The purchase was considered a strategic purchase; the hotel would not be considered a part of the Disneyland hotel portfolio and would operate independently. Disney indicated in August 2016, that the company would be closing the Carousel Inn in October 2016 in preparation for razing it as part of plans to construct a new parking structure, transit plaza and pedestrian bridge over Harbor Boulevard.

On February 10, 2017, Disney revealed a deal to purchase Kingdom Holding Co.'s shares of Euro Disney S.C.A. as the first step in purchasing the remaining shares held by others. Disney has offered about $2.12 a share, a 67% premium over the Euronext Paris Stock Exchange value as of February 9. The company expects the buyout and delisting to be finished by June. Plans are for the company to invest another $1.4 billion into Disneyland Paris after the buyout to counteract the recent Paris terrorist attack, which hurt a previous 2014 park hotel investment. If this buyout is successful, it would make the resort the only resort 100% owned and operated by Disney outside of the United States of America. On June 13, 2017, The Walt Disney Company reached the 95% threshold required for a mandatory takeover according to French law, owning 97.08% of Euro Disney S.C.A., paving the way for The Walt Disney Company to become the sole owner and operator of Disneyland Paris.

Disney Parks, Experiences and Products 

As part of The Walt Disney Company’s March 2018 strategic reorganization, Disney Consumer Products, and Interactive Media was merged into the Walt Disney Parks and Resorts segment and renamed Walt Disney Parks, Experiences and Products. Parks and Resorts Chairman Bob Chapek was named chairman of this new segment, who also previously served as head of Disney Consumer Products. At the time, the Consumer Products chairman position was vacant, as its former holder, James Pitaro, had been recently appointed as the new head of ESPN and co-chair of Disney Media Networks.

In March 2018, a Disney Parks West regional division was formed with Disneyland Resort in California, Walt Disney World in Florida, and Disneyland Paris under Catherine Powell, outgoing Disneyland Paris president. This mirrors the Disney Parks East regional division consisting of Shanghai Disney Resort, Hong Kong Disneyland and Walt Disney Attractions Japan and headed by Michael Colglazier. Imagineering was expected to take on the development of merchandise, games, publishing, and apps. Paul Gainer moved up from Disney Retail head to head up the new Global Product Management and Distribution unit, which includes Disney Retail, Global Licensing, and digital guest experience.

New Vacation Operations and Disney Cruise Line division was renamed Disney Signature Experiences along with a new president, Jeff Vahle, for the division in April 2018. On January 1, 2019, Walt Disney Parks, Experiences and Consumer Products changed its name to Disney Parks, Experiences and Products. Disney Cruise Line purchase in early March 2019 another Bahamas destination, Lighthouse Point property on the island of Eleuthera. In July 2019, Disney denied reports of plans to launch its own airline with the purchase of small regional airlines in the United States.

With the acquisition of 21st Century Fox by August 2019, National Geographic Partners' non-TV operations were transferred into its Disney counterpart with NG Media and National Geographic Expeditions moving to the segment's units, Disney Publishing Worldwide and Disney Signature Experiences, respectively.

Powell supervised the two Star Wars-themed land, Star Wars: Galaxy's Edge, openings in May at Disneyland and August 2019 in Disney's Hollywood Studios. However, initial numbers showed an attendance dropped instead of the boost such an opening should have generated. In late September, Powell left the company with the Parks West regional division being dissolved, thus having those resorts' executives directly report to chairman Chapek. He denied that Powell was let go because of the low attendance issue from Galaxy's Edge, but instead, Powell's position was a temporary one to allow Chapek to focus on the acquisition of 21st Century Fox.

Powell's departure from Disney was soon followed by a domino of executive appointments, as announced on September 26, 2019. George Kalogridis, then-president of the Walt Disney World Resort, was promoted as the president of segment development and enrichment. Kalogridis is replaced by Josh D'Amaro, then-president of the Disneyland Resort, as president of the Walt Disney World Resort. In turn, D'Amaro was replaced by Rebecca Campbell as president of the Disneyland Resort. Campbell transferred from the Walt Disney Direct-to-Consumer & International segment where she served as the president of Europe, the Middle East, and Africa. Both D'Amaro and Campbell assumed these roles in November 2019. In addition, Michael Colglazier is also promoted as the president and managing director of Disney Parks International and will oversee Disneyland Paris as well as those under the Parks East regional division. In February 2020, Chapek was promoted from chairman of this segment to chief executive officer of the Walt Disney Company under executive chairman Bob Iger.

With the closure of all Disney parks in 2020 during the coronavirus pandemic, Disney donated 150,000 rain ponchos usually sold at the parks to MedShare, to be distributed in hospitals.

In May 2020, CEO Chapek named new appointees under the Disney Parks, Experiences, and Products segment. Succeeding Chapek as chairman of this segment is Josh D'Amaro, then-president of the Walt Disney World Resort. Jeff Vahle, then-president of Disney Signature Experiences, replaced D'Amaro as president of the Walt Disney World Resort. Thomas Mazloum, senior vice president for transportation and resort operations at the Walt Disney World Resort, succeeded Vahle as president of Disney Signature Experiences. In addition, Kareem Daniel, former president of operations/product creation/publishing/games at Walt Disney Imagineering, was named president of consumer products, games and publishing. Ken Potrock replaced Rebecca Campbell as president of the Disneyland Resort; Campbell returned to the Director-to-Consumer & International segment as its chairman, replacing Kevin Mayer.

On July 15, 2020, it was announced that Jill Estorino, then-executive vice president, global marketing and sales, replaced Michael Colglazier as president and managing director of Disney Parks International, supervising Tokyo Disney Resort, Disneyland Paris, Hong Kong Disneyland, and Shanghai Disney Resort.

On September 28, 2020, D'Amaro announced the difficult decision to lay off over 28,000 employees in the parks division, many of them being part-time workers. D'Amaro cited the uncertainty of the ongoing COVID-19 pandemic as well as California's continued reluctance to reopen Disneyland as factors. Nearly 6,700 Central Florida employees, including almost 6,500 Disney World workers, were also among those laid off. On October 13, 2020, Disney CEO and former Disney Park, Experiences and Products head Bob Chapek agreed to keep Disney World at only 25% capacity until the Center For Disease Control (CDC) issued new guidance and also stated that with regards to reopening Disneyland, "It's not much of a negotiation. It's pretty much a mandate that we stay closed."  Disneyland Resort was finally allowed to reopen on April 30, 2021, after a 412-day closure.

Historically, Imagineering and certain other Disney units merged into DPEP were physically headquartered in the Los Angeles metropolitan area (near the Walt Disney Company's film and television divisions)—even as the rapid growth of Walt Disney World meant that by the start of the 21st century, most Disney U.S. domestic theme park jobs were based in Florida, not California.  In July 2021, it was reported that approximately 2,000 DPEP positions would be transferred over the next couple of years to a new 60-acre corporate campus in the Lake Nona area of Orlando, Florida, and it was later reported that fall that as many as 90% of the transferred positions would be Imagineering positions.  The relocation was reportedly motivated in part by $570 million in tax breaks from the state of Florida, as well as Florida's business-friendly climate, lower cost of living, and lack of a state income tax.

Leadership 
 Josh D'Amaro, Chairman
 Lisa Becket, Senior Vice President, Global Marketing
 Barbara Bouza, President, Walt Disney Imagineering
 Jill Estorino, President and Managing Director, Disney Parks International
 George Gross, Senior Vice President and Managing Director, Walt Disney Attractions Japan
 Michael Moriarty, Managing Director, Hong Kong Disneyland Resort
 Natacha Rafalski, Présidente, Disneyland Paris
 Joe Schott, President and General Manager, Shanghai Disney Resort
 Gail Evans, Executive Vice President, Chief Digital and Technology Officer
 Tasia Filippatos, President, Consumer Products, Games and Publishing
 Tami Garcia, Senior Vice President, Human Resources and Diversity and Inclusion
 Margaret Giacalone, Chief Counsel
 Alannah Hall-Smith, Senior Vice President, Communications and Public Affairs
 Kevin Lansberry, Executive Vice President and Chief Financial Officer
 Thomas Mazloum, President, New Experiences Portfolio and Disney Signature Experiences
 Stephanie Young, President, Disney Vacation Club, Adventures & Expeditions, and Enrichment Programs
 Ken Potrock, President, Disneyland Resort
 Jeff Vahle, President, Walt Disney World
 Bruce Vaughn, Chief Creative Officer, Walt Disney Imagineering

Disney resorts 

The New York Times has noted that "the sun never sets on a Disney theme park".

Disneyland Resort 

Disneyland was founded as a single park by Walt Disney and opened on July 17, 1955, in Anaheim, California. Disneyland Hotel opened to the public on October 5, 1955. In 2001, the site expanded significantly and was renamed the Disneyland Resort with the opening of Disney California Adventure Park on February 8, 2001, Disney's Grand Californian Hotel & Spa on January 2, 2001, Disney's Paradise Pier Hotel on December 15, 2000, and Downtown Disney on January 12, 2001. Disneyland was re-branded Disneyland Park to distinguish it from the larger resort complex. The resort focuses on Mickey Mouse and other Disney characters and occupies .

Walt Disney World 

The Walt Disney World resort opened October 1, 1971, in Lake Buena Vista, Florida, with the Magic Kingdom theme park and three resort hotels. It expanded with the opening of the theme parks Epcot in 1982, Disney-MGM Studios (now Disney's Hollywood Studios) in 1989 and Disney's Animal Kingdom in 1998, in addition to the water parks Disney's Typhoon Lagoon in 1989 and Disney's Blizzard Beach in 1995. In addition the resort includes a retail, dining, and entertainment complex entitled Disney Springs. The resort is the largest (by area) and most-visited vacation resort in the world, with four theme parks, two water parks, 21 resort hotels, eight golf courses, and several additional recreational activities. The resort covers 27,258 acres in total.

Other venues:
 ESPN Wide World of Sports Complex

Tokyo Disney Resort 

Tokyo Disney Resort, in Urayasu, Chiba, Japan, opened April 15, 1983, as Tokyo Disneyland. On September 4, 2001, the resort expanded with Tokyo DisneySea. There are several resort hotels on-site, but only three are owned by the resort, which boasts the largest parking structure in the world. Designed by Walt Disney Imagineering, the resort is fully owned and operated by The Oriental Land Company and licensed by The Walt Disney Company. The Walt Disney Attractions Japan team at The Walt Disney Company communicates with the Oriental Land Company over all aspects of the resort and assigns Imagineers to it. Its properties, below, are divided into parks, shopping centers, and lodging.

Shopping, dining, and entertainment complex: Ikspiari

Disneyland Paris 

Disneyland Paris, Disney's second international resort complex, and the largest Disney resort outside the United States, opened on April 12, 1992, as Euro Disney Resort. Located in Marne-la-Vallée in the suburbs of Paris, France, it features two theme parks, Disneyland Park & Walt Disney Studios Park, a golf course, an entertainment complex, and seven Disney resort hotels. It is the only resort outside the United States fully owned and operated by The Walt Disney Company. Its properties, listed below, occupy  and are divided into parks and shopping centers.

Hong Kong Disneyland Resort 

Hong Kong Disneyland Resort, Disney's fifth resort and its second in Asia, opened September 12, 2005. The resort is located in Penny's Bay, Lantau Island, Hong Kong. The resort consists of Hong Kong Disneyland theme park, Inspiration Lake Recreation Centre, and three hotels, with land reserved for future expansion. It is owned and operated by Hong Kong International Theme Parks, an incorporated company jointly owned by The Walt Disney Company and the Government of Hong Kong. The first phase of Hong Kong Disneyland Resort occupies .

Shanghai Disney Resort 

In November 2009, Disney received approval from the central government of China to build a Disney theme park, Shanghai Disneyland Park, in Shanghai's Pudong district. "China is one of the most dynamic, exciting and important countries in the world and this approval marks a very significant milestone for Walt Disney Co in mainland China," said Robert Iger, president and CEO of Disney. The resort opened on June 16, 2016. A groundbreaking ceremony took place on April 7, 2011.
Shopping, dining, and entertainment complex: Disneytown

Training 
Each new employee ("cast member") at a Disney theme park is trained at a Disney University, founded by Walt Disney in 1955. Before training specific to the work they will perform, each employee attends the "Disney Traditions" course where they learn about the philosophies and history of Disney's guest services.

Abandoned and misreported concepts 

Disney had plans to build Walt Disney's Riverfront Square in St. Louis, but canceled the project in July 1965.

In the 1960s, Disney initiated a plan for a ski resort at Mineral King in California. Opposition from environmental groups led by the Sierra Club led to a temporary court injunction in 1969 and legal battles through the 1970s. The project's planning and scale changed multiple times, and in 1978, Mineral King was annexed into Sequoia National Park, ending any possibility of developing a resort there.

Disney had plans to build a park named Disney's America in Haymarket, Virginia, but abandoned the idea in 1994. On September 28, 1994, Michael Eisner announced Disney was canceling its plans after a bruising national media fight with Protect Historic America, and aggressive local opposition in Virginia from Protect Prince William and other citizen groups.

Disney had plans to build a smaller Disneyland-style theme park in Sydney, Australia, between 2007 and 2008, with the proposed name "Disney Wharf at Sydney Harbour", but the concept was abandoned due to mixed responses in the New South Wales Government.

In early January 2011, conflicting reports emerged regarding Disney's involvement in a proposed entertainment complex in Haifa, Israel, whose plans include a small (30,000 square meter) amusement park scheduled to open in 2013. The project was set to be partially funded by Shamrock Holdings, a Disney-affiliated investment firm. In the wake of reports from Israeli business newspaper, Globes and industry newswire Amusement Management that Disney itself would be involved in the project's development, a spokesperson for Walt Disney Parks and Resorts clarified to Fast Company that Disney did not have any plans to be involved in the building of the park.

Disney intellectual properties outside Disney parks 
Due to its acquisitions of Marvel Entertainment in 2009, Lucasfilm in 2012 and 21st Century Fox in 2019, some Disney-owned franchises are represented in its competitors' parks.

Marvel Entertainment 
Marvel Super Hero Island, a themed land featuring characters and settings from Marvel Comics, has operated at Universal Orlando Resort's Islands of Adventure park since 1999, as well as the Islands of Adventure, cloned ride The Amazing Adventures of Spider-Man at Universal Studios Japan since 2004. Under Marvel's 1994 agreement with Universal Destinations & Experiences in regional terms, none of the Marvel characters and other persons related to such characters (e.g., side characters, team members, and the villains associated with the Avengers, Fantastic Four, X-Men, Spider-Man, etc.) connected with Islands of Adventure and Universal Studios Japan can be used at Walt Disney World and Tokyo Disney Resort. The Disneyland Resort, Walt Disney World Resort, and Tokyo Disney Resort also cannot use the Marvel brand name as part of an attraction or marketing and the Marvel-themed simulator ride. This clause has allowed Walt Disney World to have meet-and-greets with Marvel characters not associated with the ones present at Islands of Adventure, such as Star-Lord and Gamora from Guardians of the Galaxy, and Doctor Strange. Hong Kong Disneyland, Shanghai Disneyland, and Disneyland Paris either have or planned to incorporate meet and greets as well as attractions relating to the Marvel characters, as well as using the Marvel name and the Marvel simulator ride.

IMG Worlds of Adventure in Dubai has a Marvel-themed section.

Star Wars 
A Star Wars-themed section of Legoland California's Miniland USA opened in 2011, with a similar version opening at Legoland Florida in November 2012, just weeks before Disney's acquisition of Lucasfilm and the Star Wars franchise. However, the Star Wars-themed sections at Miniland USA, Legoland Florida, and other Legoland areas closed at the start of 2020 before the 2020 theme park season due to the expiration of their contract with Lucasfilm.

20th Century Studios 
Following Disney's acquisition of 21st Century Fox in March 2019, The Simpsons became the intellectual property of Disney. Like Marvel before it, The Simpsons is represented in Universal parks, with The Simpsons Ride having operated at Universal Studios Hollywood and Universal Studios Florida since 2008, with accompanying themed areas based on the show's setting of Springfield.

The Fox acquisition also made Disney responsible for the future of Malaysia's under-construction 20th Century Fox World theme park. The park's owner, Genting Group, filed a $1.75 billion lawsuit against The Walt Disney Company and 21st Century Fox in November 2018, accusing Fox of trying to back out of the deal for licensing the theme park. In the suit, Genting Malaysia alleges that Fox has taken steps to cancel the contract. The suit also names Disney as a defendant, contending that Disney executives, following the company's then-pending acquisition of Fox, were "calling the shots" on the project and that they were opposed to the park because they would have "no control" over its operations and that it would be adjacent to a casino, which would go against Disney's "family-friendly" image. Fox, in turn, referred to the suit as "without merit", stating that their reasons for withdrawing from the deal were due to Genting consistently not meeting "agreed-upon deadlines for several years" and that Genting's attempts to blame Disney for Fox's default were "made up". In July 2019, it was announced that Fox and Genting had settled their respective lawsuits. As part of the deal, Genting would be given "a license to use certain Fox intellectual properties" and that non-Fox intellectual property would make up the rest of the attractions in the park. The outdoor park would also no longer be referred to as 20th Century Fox World, but instead would be named Genting SkyWorlds.

Adaptations 

While Disney Parks generally adapt movies into rides, some Disney theme park attractions have been adapted into or have served inspiration for films,  books, comic books, television series, television specials and television pilots. Disney entered the television field with a network TV show named after Disneyland (which was then its only park, and was being built at the time), in order to fund the park. In this series, some episodes featured the park or a park attraction. The Walt Disney Company pioneered and is the only film company and theme park company to have converted theme park attractions to film productions. However, lackluster results were achieved for most of these films except for the Pirates of the Caribbean series. Walt Disney Pictures produced two Pirates of the Caribbean sequels in 2006 and 2011 that made approximately a billion dollars each at the box office.

At first, Disney had merely dabbled with this type of film. Disney Telefilms made the first movie-based-on-ride, Tower of Terror, for the Wonderful World of Disney anthology television series in 1997. In 2000, Touchstone Pictures made Mission to Mars based on the closed ride of the same name.

Walt Disney Pictures took the Country Bear Jamboree attraction and made it into The Country Bears in 2002. In 2003, Walt Disney Pictures issued two ride-based films in Pirates of the Caribbean: The Curse of the Black Pearl and The Haunted Mansion. Pirates of the Caribbean launched a film series and a franchise. After four Pirates sequels, the franchise took in more than $5.4 billion worldwide.

Disney Publishing Worldwide started mining Disney Parks with its The Kingdom Keepers series. The first novel of the series, Disney After Dark, was released in 2005. A five-book series was laid out by Pearson, but was extended to seven with the first book's success.

With the Pirates of the Caribbean franchise as Disney Pictures' top franchise, the company had been looking for additional projects in this category for a decade. Disney Pictures took another push at additional adaptations in the 2010s. By November 2010, Jon Favreau had been tapped to develop the Magic Kingdom park into a "Night at the Museum" like film, with Strike Entertainment signed on to produce it after a script by Ronald D. Moore was turned down. Another Haunted Mansion film was in the works with Guillermo del Toro as of August 2012. Mr. Toad's Wild Ride ride film was in the works at Disney Pictures by January 2013. Tomorrowland, first to be loosely based on a theme park area, was announced in January 2013 for a December 2014 release. Also in 2013, American Broadcasting Company had ordered a pilot based on Big Thunder Mountain Railroad. It's A Small World was added to the list of known 2 projects in November 26, 2013 and April 22, 2014. Tower of Terror was given a theatrical treatment by John August under producer Jim Whitaker in October 2015, while the long-in-production Jungle Cruise gained an actor.

Marvel Worldwide with Disney announced in October 2013 that in January 2014 it would release its first comic book title under their joint Disney Kingdoms imprint. Running for six miniseries, Disney Kingdoms would feature adaptations of the unbuilt Museum of the Weird, two serials about Figment and Dreamfinder from Epcot's Journey into Imagination, Big Thunder Mountain Railroad, the Haunted Mansion, and Walt Disney's Enchanted Tiki Room. Disney Publishing Worldwide's revived Disney Comics imprint first publication was the Space Mountain graphic novel released on May 7, 2014 and based on the same name park attraction.

On March 31, 2015, the first novel in The Kingdom Keepers sequel trilogy series was released.

In May 2017, Freeform cable channel aired a special documentary, Disney's Fairy Tale Weddings, based on the services provided by Disney Parks and Resorts unit, Disney's Fairy Tale Weddings & Honeymoons. With success of the May special, the show was picked up as a series with seven episodes in October 2017. However, another special, Holiday Magic, was aired on December 11, 2017 with the now six episode regular series starting on June 11, 2018.

Other ventures

Disney Signature Experiences 
Disney Signature Experiences division, formerly called Disney Cruise Line & New Vacation Operations, holds newer non-theme park travel units under president Thomas Mazloum.

In February 2009, Tom McAlpin left the Disney Cruise Line presidency and was replaced by Karl Holz as president of both Disney Cruise Line and New Vacation Operations. New Vacation Operations included the Adventures by Disney. The cruise line ordered three ships of a new class of ship, Triton, in 2016 and 2017. In April 2017, it was announced that Karl Holz would retire as president of Disney Cruise Line on February 15, 2018 and Anthony Connelly would assumed the role of president on October 1, 2017.

Soon after a March 2018 conglomerate wide reorganization that formed Disney Parks, Experiences and Products segment division, Disney Cruise Line and New Vacation Operations was renamed Disney Signature Experiences along with a new president, Jeff Vahle. Ken Potrock was promoted from Senior Vice President and General Manager of Disney Vacation Club to President of Consumer Products in May 2018. Disney Cruise Line purchased in early March 2019 another Bahamas destination, Lighthouse Point property on the island of Eleuthera from the Bahamas Government.

With the acquisition of 21st Century Fox by August 2019, National Geographic Partners' National Geographic Expeditions moved into Disney Signature Experiences.

 Disney Cruise Line was formed in 1995. Its fleet comprises five ships: Disney Magic (launched 1998), Disney Wonder (1999), Disney Dream (2011), Disney Fantasy (2012), and Disney Wish (2022). Disney Cruise Line has ordered two new ships that will be completed in 2024 and 2025. Each ship was designed and built-in collaboration with Walt Disney Imagineering. Disney Cruise Line serves the Caribbean, Mexican Riviera, European, and Alaskan cruises market.
 Disney Vacation Club, a timeshare program that includes 14 themed hotels-resorts within Disneyland Resort and Walt Disney World Resort,  plus Disney's Aulani Resort, Disney's Hilton Head Island Resort, and Disney's Vero Beach Resort. In December 2019, the 15th property, Disney's Riviera Resort, opened next to the Caribbean Beach Resort at Walt Disney World. A 16th resort, Reflections – A Disney Lakeside Lodge, was planned to open in 2022 just east of Disney's Wilderness Lodge on the former site of Disney's River Country water park. As of 2022, all references to the resort had been removed from Disney websites and digital press releases, suggesting that development of the resort had been either cancelled or postponed for a later date, likely due to the COVID-19 pandemic.
 Adventures by Disney, a program of all-inclusive, guided vacation tour packages offered at predominantly non-Disney sites around the world.
 National Geographic Expeditions
Golden Oak Realty, Golden Oak at Walt Disney World Resort sales

Disney Sports Enterprises 

Disney Sports Enterprises, formerly called Disney Sports Attractions, is the unit of Disney Parks, Experiences and Products for Disney's sports functions and is made up of the ESPN Wide World of Sports Complex and the runDisney program.

DSE background 
Disney Golf facilities date back to the opening of Disney World with two golf courses, the Palm and Magnolia courses. At the time, those courses started hosting the Walt Disney World Open Invitational, an annual PGA Tour event.

In 1994, Disney held the Walt Disney World Marathon, its first road race added additional races later. Disneyland Marathon and 5K were run in 1995 three weeks after the LA Marathon on March 26, 1995.

In 1995, Disney World had IMS Events, Inc. build the Walt Disney World Speedway. Disney's Wide World of Sports opened in 1997 under executive Reggie Williams.

DSE history 
By 1998, Williams was named vice president of Disney Sports Attractions, overseeing a newly created sports & recreation division. The first 10K Disney Classic race on October 3, 1999, kicked off Disney World's 15-month Millennium Celebration. On March 30, 2003, Sports Attractions held the first Disney Inline Marathon.

On November 21, 2007, Reggie Williams retired as vice president of Disney Sports Attractions. His replacement was named on January 3, 2008, when Ken Potrock was promoted to Senior Vice President, Disney Sports Enterprises. On February 25, 2010, Disney's Wide World of Sports was renamed ESPN Wide World of Sports Complex with some upgrades and new facilities.

On September 25, 2011, Disney started the lease of its five Disney World golf courses (Palm, Magnolia, Lake Buena Vista, Osprey Ridge, and Oak Trail) to Arnold Palmer Golf Management to operate for 20 years while splitting the revenue. As part of the deal, Arnold Palmer would redesign the Palm course. The Orlando market for golf had a glut of course from the building boom then bust making profitability a challenge for any golf course. Disney hoped that Palmer's involvement and "Palmer Advantage" membership club would draw more attention to Disney's course. With the Osprey Ridge course sold to Four Seasons Hotels and Resorts to build a hotel, which was delayed until 2014, the golf management company would run the course until hotel construction begins. While another golf course, the Eagle Pines, was closed several years ago to make way for a residential housing subdivision development called Golden Oak being built in 2011.

In January 2013, Ken Petrock was promoted to Disney Vacation Club and Adventures by Disney senior vice president & general manager while Tom Wolber, Disney Cruise Line senior vice president of operations, was promoted to replace Petrock at Disney Sports. In late June 2015, the Walt Disney World Speedway was shut down.

Sports marketing director Faron Kelley was promoted to vice president of sports in January 2016 and has responsibility for the water parks too. Senior vice president of Disney Springs and the ESPN Wide World of Sports Maribeth Bisienere was promoted to Senior Vice President of Parks in early March 2018. Rosalyn Durant moved over from ESPN to be appointed in February 2020 as senior vice president of operations for Disney Springs, ESPN Wide World of Sports and Waterparks.

Halfway to Halloween
An advertisement campaign exclusively from Disney Parks, Experiences and Products, selling Halloween-themed merchandising and food all throughout the Disney parks and resort, occurring during spring from April to May.

See also 
 Disney Consumer Products and Interactive Media
 Anaheim Sports

References 

From :

From :

From :

From :

From :

From :

From :

From :

From :

External links 

 

American companies established in 1971
 
Parks, Experiences and Products
Parks, Experiences and Resorts
Amusement park companies
Hospitality companies of the United States
Entertainment companies based in California
Companies based in Florida
Companies based in Burbank, California
Entertainment companies established in 1971
1971 establishments in California